The 2017 British Flat Jockeys Championship was the competition to find the British flat racing Champion Jockey, the winningmost jockey in Great Britain during the peak period of the British flat racing season from the start of the Guineas Meeting on Saturday 6 May to British Champions Day on Saturday 21 October 2017. It was won by Silvestre de Sousa for the second time. He finished with 155 winners in the qualifying period, ahead of the reigning champion, Jim Crowley. De Sousa had in fact passed 200 winners for the year at Lingfield on 18 October, and had effectively won the title many weeks before.

De Sousa was presented with award in a ceremony at Ascot. He said of the victory, "It's great to be here after a long season. I've worked really hard this year and I always wanted to win the title again and I finally did. For the last few weeks I've been very confident that no one could catch me. Whoever was in second and third, they were going to need to work twice as hard to catch me."

The Championship was sponsored by Stobart.

Final table

References

Horse racing in Great Britain
2017 in horse racing